The 1993 Turkish presidential election refers to the election to choose the country's ninth president, to succeed Turgut Özal who had recently died. The candidate of DYP was Süleyman Demirel who was also supported by SHP. In the first and second rounds, the ruling party DYP was unsuccessful in electing its candidate, Süleyman Demirel.  Finally, in the third round, Süleyman Demirel was elected as the ninth President of Turkey.

Procedure

The presidential vote is held in parliament by secret ballot. A candidate requires a two-thirds majority - or 300 votes - to be elected in the first two rounds. If there is no clear winner before the third round, the winning threshold is dropped to a simple majority, or 226 votes. If there is still no winner, the two candidates with the most votes from the third round progress to a runoff election, where the simply majority rule still applies. In the event of no clear winner among the two, the Turkish constitution states that a snap general election must be called to overcome the parliamentary deadlock.

Results 

1993
1993 elections in Turkey
Indirect elections
May 1993 events in Europe